Cyphothyris is a genus of moth in the family Cosmopterigidae.

Species
Cyphothyris disphaerias Meyrick, 1932
Cyphothyris ophryodes Meyrick, 1914
Cyphothyris pyrrhophrys Meyrick, 1932

References
Natural History Museum Lepidoptera genus database

Cosmopterigidae
Moth genera